Monnett Bain Davis (August 13, 1893 – December 26, 1953) was an American diplomat in the early and mid 20th century.

Early life
Davis was born in Greencastle, Indiana on August 13, 1893. He was named for his maternal grandmother, Mary Monnett Bain, a benefactress of the Ohio Wesleyan University in Delaware, Ohio. He was educated at the University of Colorado, A.B.

During World War I, he served in the American Expeditionary Force (AEF) in the United States Army.

Diplomatic career
Following WWI, Davis entered into the United States Foreign Service and served tours of duty representing American interests abroad as US Consul in Port Elizabeth (1921–23) and Saltillo (1924) and then as US Consul General in Stockholm (1933-1934), Shanghai (1935–36), Singapore (1936–37) and Buenos Aires (1938-41).

During WWII, he served as the Deputy Director of the Office of the Foreign Service and then as Director General of the Foreign Service.

Post World War II, Davis served as United States Minister in Denmark from June 1945 to January 1946.  He was then appointed once again as United States Consul-General in Shanghai from 1946 to 1947.  In 1948, we was given his assignment as United States Ambassador to Panama serving until 1951 before being transferred to the post of U.S. Ambassador to Israel in 1951.

Death
Ambassador Davis died in his sleep in the United States Embassy in Tel Aviv on December 26, 1953.  His body was returned to the United States and interred at Arlington National Cemetery (Section 2, Grave 4876).

See also
 Mary Monnett Bain
 Orra E. Monnette

References

External links

United States State Department

1893 births
1953 deaths
Ambassadors of the United States to Israel
Ambassadors of the United States to Panama
Ambassadors of the United States to Denmark
People from Greencastle, Indiana
United States Army personnel of World War I
Burials at Arlington National Cemetery
Consuls general of the United States in Shanghai
United States Foreign Service personnel